Lenčiai (formerly) is a village in Kėdainiai district municipality, in Kaunas County, in central Lithuania. According to the 2011 census, the village had a population of 18 people.

History
Lenčiai village is known since 1578. A big battle between the January Uprising resurgents and Tsarist army occurred here on 1 April 1863.

Demography

Notable people
Mykolas Kuprevičius (1864–1932), Lithuanian publicist, entographer born in Lenčiai;
Mikalojus Katkus (1852–1944), Lithuanian writer, agronomist, buried in the Lenčiai cemetery.

References

Villages in Kaunas County
Kėdainiai District Municipality